The Petitfils-Boos House is an Italian Renaissance Revival  mansion in the Hancock Park section of Los Angeles, California.  It was designed by Charles F. Plummer and built in 1922.

In 2005, the house was added to the National Register of Historic Places based on architectural criteria.

See also
 National Register of Historic Places listings in Los Angeles
 List of Los Angeles Historic-Cultural Monuments in the Wilshire and Westlake areas

References

Houses on the National Register of Historic Places in Los Angeles
Los Angeles Historic-Cultural Monuments
Houses completed in 1922
Renaissance Revival architecture in California
Italian Renaissance Revival architecture in the United States
Hancock Park, Los Angeles